Democracy at work may refer to:

Concepts 
 Democracy
 Workplace democracy
 Co-determination

Organizations 
 Democracy at Work, a nonprofit founded by Richard D. Wolff

Books 
 Democracy at work: A cure for capitalism, a 2012 book by Richard D. Wolff
 Democracy at work: Citizens and their governments, a 2007 book by Fredrik Liljeblad
 Democracy at work, a book by Stephen Abel
 Democracy at work, a 1985 book by Tom Schuller
 Democracy at work: The report of the Norwegian industrial democracy program a 1976 book by Fred E. Emery
 Democracy at work: A citizen's guide, a 2016 book by Wil Mara
 Democracy at work: Changing world markets and the future of labor unions, a 1991 book by Lowell Turner
 Democracy at work: Contract, status and post-industrial justice, a 2022 book by Ruth Dukes & Wolfgang Streeck
 Democracy at work: A book for active trade unionists, a 1977 book by BBC
 Democracy at work: A comparative sociology of environmental regulation in the United Kingdom, France, Germany, and the United States, a 2000 book by Richard Münch